Eugene Gladstone O'Neill (October 16, 1888 – November 27, 1953) was an American playwright awarded the 1936 Nobel Prize in Literature. His poetically titled plays were among the first to introduce into the U.S. the drama techniques of realism, earlier associated with Russian playwright Anton Chekhov, Norwegian playwright Henrik Ibsen, and Swedish playwright August Strindberg. The tragedy Long Day's Journey into Night is often included on lists of the finest U.S. plays in the 20th century, alongside Tennessee Williams's A Streetcar Named Desire and Arthur Miller's Death of a Salesman.

O'Neill's plays were among the first to include speeches in American English vernacular and involve characters on the fringes of society. They struggle to maintain their hopes and aspirations, but ultimately slide into disillusion and despair. Of his very few comedies, only one is well-known (Ah, Wilderness!). Nearly all of his other plays involve some degree of tragedy and personal pessimism.

Early life

O'Neill was born in a hotel, the Barrett House, at Broadway and 43rd Street, on what was then Longacre Square (now Times Square) in New York City. A commemorative plaque was first dedicated there in 1957. The site is now occupied by 1500 Broadway, which houses offices, shops and the ABC Studios.

He was the son of Irish immigrant actor James O'Neill and Mary Ellen Quinlan, who was also of Irish descent. His father suffered from alcoholism; his mother from an addiction to morphine, prescribed to relieve the pains of the difficult birth of Eugene, who was her third son. Because his father was often on tour with a theatrical company, accompanied by Eugene's mother, in 1895 O'Neill was sent to St. Aloysius Academy for Boys, a Catholic boarding school in the Riverdale section of the Bronx. In 1900, he became a day student at the De La Salle Institute on 59th Street in Manhattan.

The O'Neill family reunited for summers at the Monte Cristo Cottage in New London, Connecticut. He also briefly attended Betts Academy in Stamford. He attended Princeton University for one year. Accounts vary as to why he left. He may have been dropped for attending too few classes, been suspended for "conduct code violations", or "for breaking a window", or according to a more concrete but possibly apocryphal account, because he threw "a beer bottle into the window of Professor Woodrow Wilson", the future president of the United States.

O'Neill spent several years at sea, during which he suffered from depression, alcoholism and dereliction. Despite this, he had a deep love for the sea and it became a prominent theme in many of his plays, several of which are set on board ships like those on which he worked. O'Neill joined the Marine Transport Workers Union of the Industrial Workers of the World (IWW), which was fighting for improved living conditions for the working class using quick 'on the job' direct action. O'Neill's parents and elder brother Jamie (who drank himself to death at the age of 45) died within three years of one another, not long after he had begun to make his mark in the theater.

Career
After his experience in 1912–13 at a sanatorium where he was recovering from tuberculosis, he decided to devote himself full-time to writing plays (the events immediately prior to going to the sanatorium are dramatized in his masterpiece, Long Day's Journey into Night). O'Neill had previously been employed by the New London Telegraph, writing poetry as well as reporting. In the fall of 1914, he entered Harvard University to attend a course in dramatic technique given by George Piece Baker, but left after one year.

During the 1910s O'Neill was a regular on the Greenwich Village literary scene, where he also befriended many radicals, most notably Communist Labor Party of America founder John Reed. O'Neill also had a brief romantic relationship with Reed's wife, writer Louise Bryant. O'Neill was portrayed by Jack Nicholson in the 1981 film Reds, about the life of John Reed; Louise Bryant was portrayed by Diane Keaton.
His involvement with the Provincetown Players began in mid-1916. Terry Carlin reported that O'Neill arrived for the summer in Provincetown with "a trunk full of plays", but this was an exaggeration. Susan Glaspell describes a reading of Bound East for Cardiff that took place in the living room of Glaspell and her husband George Cram Cook's home on Commercial Street, adjacent to the wharf (pictured) that was used by the Players for their theater: "So Gene took Bound East for Cardiff out of his trunk, and Freddie Burt read it to us, Gene staying out in the dining-room while reading went on. He was not left alone in the dining-room when the reading had finished." The Provincetown Players performed many of O'Neill's early works in their theaters both in Provincetown and on MacDougal Street in Greenwich Village. Some of these early plays, such as The Emperor Jones, began downtown and then moved to Broadway.

In an early one-act play, The Web, written in 1913, O'Neill first explored the darker themes that he later thrived on.  Here he focused on the brothel world and the lives of prostitutes, which also play a role in some fourteen of his later plays. In particular, he memorably included the birth of an infant into the world of prostitution. At the time, such themes constituted a huge innovation, as these sides of life had never before been presented with such success.

O'Neill's first published play, Beyond the Horizon, opened on Broadway in 1920 to great acclaim, and was awarded the Pulitzer Prize for Drama. His first major hit was The Emperor Jones, which ran on Broadway in 1920 and obliquely commented on the U.S. occupation of Haiti that was a topic of debate in that year's presidential election.  His best-known plays include Anna Christie (Pulitzer Prize 1922), Desire Under the Elms (1924), Strange Interlude (Pulitzer Prize 1928), Mourning Becomes Electra (1931), and his only well-known comedy, Ah, Wilderness!, a wistful re-imagining of his youth as he wished it had been.

In 1936, O'Neill received the Nobel Prize in Literature after he had been nominated that year by Henrik Schück, member of the Swedish Academy. O'Neill was profoundly influenced by the work of Swedish writer August Strindberg, and upon receiving the Nobel Prize, dedicated much of his acceptance speech to describing Strindberg's influence on his work. In conversation with Russel Crouse, O'Neill said that "the Strindberg part of the speech is no 'telling tale' to please the Swedes with a polite gesture. It is absolutely sincere. [...] And it's absolutely true that I am proud of the opportunity to acknowledge my debt to Strindberg thus publicly to his people". Before the speech was sent to Stockholm, O'Neill read it to his friend Sophus Keith Winther. As he was reading, he suddenly interrupted himself with the comment: "I wish immortality were a fact, for then some day I would meet Strindberg". When Winther objected that "that would scarcely be enough to justify immortality", O'Neill answered quickly and firmly: "It would be enough for me".

After a ten-year pause, O'Neill's now-renowned play The Iceman Cometh was produced in 1946. The following year's A Moon for the Misbegotten failed, and it was decades before coming to be considered as among his best works.

He was also part of the modern movement to partially revive the classical heroic mask from ancient Greek theatre and Japanese Noh theatre in some of his plays, such as The Great God Brown and Lazarus Laughed.

Family life

O'Neill was married to Kathleen Jenkins from October 2, 1909, to 1912, during which time they had one son, Eugene O'Neill, Jr. (1910–1950). In 1917, O'Neill met Agnes Boulton, a successful writer of commercial fiction, and they married on April 12, 1918. They lived in a home owned by her parents in Point Pleasant, New Jersey, after their marriage. The years of their marriage—during which the couple lived in Connecticut and Bermuda and had two children, Shane and Oona—are described vividly in her 1958 memoir Part of a Long Story. They divorced on July 2, 1929, after O'Neill abandoned Boulton and the children for the actress Carlotta Monterey (born San Francisco, California, December 28, 1888; died Westwood, New Jersey, November 18, 1970). O'Neill and Carlotta married less than a month after he officially divorced his previous wife.

In 1929, O'Neill and Monterey moved to the Loire Valley in central France, where they lived in the Château du Plessis in Saint-Antoine-du-Rocher, Indre-et-Loire. During the early 1930s they returned to the United States and lived in Sea Island, Georgia, at a house called Casa Genotta. He moved to Danville, California in 1937 and lived there until 1944. His house there, Tao House, is today the Eugene O'Neill National Historic Site.

In their first years together, Monterey organized O'Neill's life, enabling him to devote himself to writing. She later became addicted to potassium bromide, and the marriage deteriorated, resulting in a number of separations, although they never divorced.

In 1943, O'Neill disowned his daughter Oona for marrying the English actor, director, and producer Charlie Chaplin when she was 18 and Chaplin was 54. He never saw Oona again.

He also had distant relationships with his sons. Eugene O'Neill Jr., a Yale classicist, suffered from alcoholism and committed suicide in 1950 at the age of 40. Shane O'Neill became a heroin addict and moved into the family home in Bermuda, Spithead, with his new wife, where he supported himself by selling off the furnishings. He was disowned by his father before also committing suicide (by jumping out of a window) a number of years later. Oona ultimately inherited Spithead and the connected estate (subsequently known as the Chaplin Estate). In 1950 O'Neill joined The Lambs, the famed theater club.

Illness and death

After suffering from multiple health problems (including depression and alcoholism) over many years, O'Neill ultimately faced a severe Parkinsons-like tremor in his hands which made it impossible for him to write during the last 10 years of his life; he had tried using dictation but found himself unable to compose in that way. While at Tao House, O'Neill had intended to write a cycle of 11 plays chronicling an American family since the 1800s. Only two of these, A Touch of the Poet and More Stately Mansions, were ever completed. As his health worsened, O'Neill lost inspiration for the project and wrote three largely autobiographical plays, The Iceman Cometh, Long Day's Journey into Night, and A Moon for the Misbegotten. He managed to complete Moon for the Misbegotten in 1943, just before leaving Tao House and losing his ability to write. Drafts of many other uncompleted plays were destroyed by Carlotta at Eugene's request.

O'Neill died at the Sheraton Hotel (now Boston University's Kilachand Hall) on Bay State Road in Boston, on November 27, 1953, at the age of 65. As he was dying, he whispered: "I knew it. I knew it. Born in a hotel room and died in a hotel room."
He is interred in the Forest Hills Cemetery in Boston's Jamaica Plain neighborhood.

In 1956 Carlotta arranged for his autobiographical play Long Day's Journey into Night to be published, although his written instructions had stipulated that it not be made public until 25 years after his death. It was produced on stage to tremendous critical acclaim and won the Pulitzer Prize in 1957. This last play is widely considered to be his finest. Other posthumously published works include A Touch of the Poet (1958) and More Stately Mansions (1967).

In 1967, the United States Postal Service honored O'Neill with a Prominent Americans series (1965–1978) $1 postage stamp.

In 2000, a team of researchers studying O'Neill's autopsy report concluded that he died of cerebellar cortical atrophy, a rare form of brain deterioration unrelated to either alcohol use or Parkinson's disease.

Legacy 
In Warren Beatty's 1981 film Reds, O'Neill is portrayed by Jack Nicholson, who was nominated for the Academy Award for Best Supporting Actor for his performance.

George C. White founded the Eugene O'Neill Theatre Center in Waterford, Connecticut in 1964.

Eugene O'Neill is a member of the American Theater Hall of Fame.

O'Neill is referenced by Upton Sinclair in The Cup of Fury (1956), by J.K. Simmons' character in Whiplash (2014), and by Tony Stark in Avengers: Age of Ultron (2015), specifically Long Day's Journey into Night.

O’Neill is referred to in Moss Hart’s 1959 book Act One, later a Broadway play.

Museums and collections
O'Neill's home in New London, Monte Cristo Cottage, was made a National Historic Landmark in 1971. His home in Danville, California, near San Francisco, was preserved as the Eugene O'Neill National Historic Site in 1976.

Connecticut College maintains the Louis Sheaffer Collection, consisting of material collected by the O'Neill biographer. The principal collection of O'Neill papers is at Yale University. The Eugene O'Neill Theater Center in Waterford, Connecticut fosters the development of new plays under his name.

There is also a theatre in New York City named after him located at 230 West 49th Street in midtown-Manhattan. The Eugene O'Neill Theatre has housed musicals and plays such as Yentl, Annie, Grease, M. Butterfly, Spring Awakening, and The Book of Mormon.

Work

Full-length plays
 Bread and Butter, 1914
 Servitude, 1914
 The Personal Equation, 1915
 Now I Ask You, 1916
 Beyond the Horizon, 1918 - Pulitzer Prize, 1920
 The Straw, 1919
 Chris Christophersen, 1919
 Gold, 1920
 Anna Christie, 1920 - Pulitzer Prize, 1922
 The Emperor Jones, 1920
 Diff'rent, 1921
 The First Man, 1922
 The Hairy Ape, 1922
 The Fountain, 1923
 Marco Millions, 1923–25
 All God's Chillun Got Wings, 1924
 Welded, 1924
 Desire Under the Elms, 1924
 Lazarus Laughed, 1925–26
 The Great God Brown, 1926
 Strange Interlude, 1928 - Pulitzer Prize
 Dynamo, 1929
 Mourning Becomes Electra, 1931
 Ah, Wilderness!, 1933
 Days Without End, 1933
 The Iceman Cometh, written 1939, published 1940, first performed 1946
 Long Day's Journey into Night, written 1941, first performed 1956; Pulitzer Prize 1957
 A Moon for the Misbegotten, written 1941–1943, first performed 1947
 A Touch of the Poet, completed in 1942, first performed 1958
 More Stately Mansions, second draft found in O'Neill's papers, first performed 1967
 The Calms of Capricorn, published in 1983

One-act plays
The Glencairn Plays, all of which feature characters on the fictional ship Glencairn—filmed together as The Long Voyage Home:
 Bound East for Cardiff, 1914
 In the Zone, 1917
 The Long Voyage Home, 1917
 Moon of the Caribbees, 1918
Other one-act plays include:
 A Wife for a Life, 1913
 The Web, 1913
 Thirst, 1913
 Recklessness, 1913
 Warnings, 1913
 Fog, 1914
 Abortion, 1914
 The Movie Man:  A Comedy, 1914
 The Sniper, 1915
 Before Breakfast, 1916
 Ile, 1917
 The Rope, 1918
 Shell Shock, 1918
 The Dreamy Kid, 1918
 Where the Cross Is Made, 1918
 Eugene O'Neill's "Exorcism" 1919<ref name="Ex">{{cite web | url=http://chronicle.com/blogs/pageview/yale-u-library-acquires-lost-play-by-eugene-oneill/29541?sid=at | title=Exorcism | publisher=Chronicle of Higher Education | work=Yale U. Library Acquires Lost Play by Eugene O'Neill | date=October 19, 2011 | access-date=October 22, 2011}} (The play, set in 1912, is based on O’Neill’s suicide attempt from an overdose of barbiturates in a Manhattan rooming house. After its premiere in 1920, O’Neill canceled the production and, it had been thought, destroyed all copies.)</ref>
 Hughie, written 1941, first performed 1959

Other works
 Tomorrow, 1917. A Small Story published in The Seven Arts, Vol. II, No. 8 in June 1917.
 The Last Will and Testament of an Extremely Distinguished Dog, 1940. Written to comfort Carlotta as their "child" Blemie was approaching his death in December 1940.

See also

 The Eugene O'Neill Award

References

Further reading

Editions of O'Neill
 
 
 

Scholarly works
 
Bryan, George B. and Wolfgang Mieder. 1995. The Proverbial Eugene O'Neill. An Index to Proverbs in the Works of Eugene Gladstone O'Neill. Westport, Connecticut: Greenwood Press.
 
 
 

 
 
 
 
 
 
 

External links

Digital collections
 
 
 Works by Eugene O'Neill at Project Gutenberg Australia
 
 
 
 Works by Eugene O'Neill (public domain in Canada)

Physical collections
 Eugene O'Neill Collection. Harry Ransom Center.
Eugene O'Neill Papers. Yale Collection of American Literature, Beinecke Rare Book and Manuscript Library.
 Eugene O'Neill Papers Addition. Yale Collection of American Literature, Beinecke Rare Book and Manuscript Library.
 Carlotta O'Neill notebook of letters and photographs, 1927-1954, held by the Billy Rose Theatre Division, New York Public Library for the Performing Arts. The notebook contains handwritten transcriptions by Carlotta O'Neill of letters and inscriptions to her from her husband, Eugene O'Neill, and photographs, mostly portraits of Eugene and Carlotta O'Neill.

Analysis and editorials
 Haunted by Eugene O'Neill—Article in BU Today'', September 29, 2009
 Eugene O’Neill: the sailor, the sickness, the stage from the Museum of the City of New York Collections blog
 The Iceman Cometh: A Study Guide

External entries
 
 
 
  (archive)

Other sources
 Eugene O'Neill official website
 Casa Genotta official website
 Eugene O'Neill National Historic Site
 American Experience - Eugene O'Neill: A Documentary Film on PBS 
 

1888 births
1953 deaths
O'Neill, Eugene
American agnostics
American Nobel laureates
American people of Irish descent
Expressionist dramatists and playwrights
Industrial Workers of the World members
Irish-American history
Laurence Olivier Award winners
Modernist theatre
Nobel laureates in Literature
People from Danville, California
People from Greenwich Village
Writers from New London, Connecticut
People from Point Pleasant, New Jersey
People from Provincetown, Massachusetts
People from Ridgefield, Connecticut
People with Parkinson's disease
Princeton University alumni
Pulitzer Prize for Drama winners
Tony Award winners
Writers from Manhattan
Deaths from pneumonia in Massachusetts
Members of The Lambs Club
Members of the American Academy of Arts and Letters